The Uthmaniyya were adherents of several political and doctrinal views regarding the third caliph, Uthman, which originated in the aftermath of his assassination in 656. The earliest Uthmaniyya held that Uthman was legitimate caliph and his murder was unjust, whereas his successor, Ali, having been complicit in the act, was an illegitimate caliph who seized power without consultation. Although not all of them were Umayyad supporters, they undermined Ali's caliphate through several revolts. In the 8th century, pro-Uthman opinion gained momentum among religious scholars, who considered only Abu Bakr, Umar, and Uthman as legitimate caliphs, but discouraged rebellion against authorities, preferring peace and unity over morally correct caliphs. They were absorbed by the Sunnis in the 9th century, when both Uthman and Ali were recognized as rightly guided caliphs. Although strongly pro-Umayyad Uthmaniyya persisted for some time, they virtually disappeared after the 10th century.

Shi'at Uthman
The adjective Uthmani was applied to different groups at different times, although feature common to all Uthmaniyya was their insistence that Uthman had been a legitimate ruler until his last hour and had been killed unjustly by rebels.

When Ali was elected caliph, the majority of the Quraysh (group of Meccan clans to which the Islamic prophet Muhammad belonged) denounced Ali's election. Although the majority of the Ansar (Medinan supporters of Muhammad) supported Ali, several prominent among them, including Nu'man ibn Bashir, Hassan ibn Thabit, Ka'b ibn Malik, Zayd ibn Thabit, and Maslama ibn Mukhallad, are named in the sources as Uthmani, and did not pledge him allegiance. In 656, Muhammad's widow Aisha and his companions Talha and al-Zubayr led the pro-Uthman forces in the Battle of the Camel in an unsuccessful attempt to overthrow Ali and punish Uthman's murderers. The cause was later taken up by Uthman's Umayyad kinsman Mu'awiya, who after an indecisive encounter with Ali (657) became caliph when the latter was assassinated in 661 by one of his rebellious ex-supporters (the Kharijites). Not all early Uthmaniyya were supporters of Mu'awiya however. Many held to the idea that the caliph should be from among the non-Hashimite early companions of Muhammad, whereas Mu'awiya had been a late convert. Nevertheless these accepted his rule for the sake of Muslim unity. He ultimately claimed the caliphate for himself when Yazid died in 683. Henceforth, the Uthmaniyya were divided into pro-Umayyad and pro-Zubayrid parties, with the former representing the majority. Other notable political Uthmaniyya included people such as Busr ibn Abi Artat and Mu'awiya ibn Hudayj.

According to the historian Patricia Crone, the Uthmaniyya originally represented the majority of those who were not aligned with the rebel cause, with a minority holding a neutralist stance. Even in Iraq, which was a hub of anti-Uthman sentiment, there were many who held Uthmani positions, especially in Basra, which was largely pro-Uthman. Ali's capital Kufa also had some pro-Uthman elements. Pro-Uthman sentiment also existed in Egypt. At the head of the Egyptian Uthmaniyya, Ibn Hudayj helped Amr ibn al-As secure Egypt for Mu'awiya from Ali's governor Muhammad ibn Abi Bakr, whom he killed in addition to Uthman's assassin, Kinana ibn Bishr. The Yemeni Uthmaniyya had at first acknowledged Ali but revolted when his caliphate started to wane in his later years. The revolt was subsequently put down.

Traditionists
Beyond the Second Civil War, little is heard of the pro-Umayyad Uthmaniyya in the sources even though the Umayyads themselves continued to stress their pro-Uthman position. From this time forward, Uthmaniyya are represented among the traditionists and scholars. Unlike the early Uthmaniyya, these did not recognize any legitimate caliphs beyond Uthman. This gave rise to the idea of three legitimate or rightly guided caliphs: Abu Bakr, Umar, and Uthman. They held Ali's caliphate illegitimate for it was seen as divisive. The Medinan traditionist Ibn Shihab al-Zuhri is reported to have said: "ʿAlī had fought Muslims and so could not be a rightly guided caliph or imām on whom one should model oneself". Numerous hadiths (sayings reportedly originating with Muhammad and early Muslims) were promulgated to the effect that there were only three legitimate caliphs. Abd Allah ibn Umar was quoted as saying "We used to, in the time of the Prophet … , consider no one equal to Abū Bakr, then ʿUmar, then ʿUthmān. Then we would leave the Companions of the Prophet … , not preferring any to another." Other notable traditionists that held this view included Hisham ibn Hassan, Sufyan al-Thawri, Malik ibn Anas, and Hammad ibn Zayd. The historian Sayf ibn Umar also subscribed to this position.

According to Crone, their doctrine seems to have been that the first three caliphs were religious guides in addition to being legitimate rulers. With the assassination of Uthman, the period of caliphs who could guide the community with right guidance had come to an end. Their place had been taken up by worldly kings. The religious knowledge had thus been transferred to the Muslim community as a whole. The caliphs, even though not ideal, were nonetheless necessary to keep the state from being fragmented and to keep law and order. It was important to preserve the unity of the community and avoid civil war instead of attempting to install correct caliphs through rebellion. Many traditionist Uthmaniyya then came to consider Abd Allah ibn Umar, Sa'd ibn Abi Waqqas, and other neutralists who had avoided taking sides in the First Civil War, as belonging to them.

Later Uthmaniyya
With the rise of Sunnism in the 9th century, when the idea of  four rightly guided caliphs (among them Uthman and Ali) gained wider acceptance, the Uthmaniyya disappeared, being absorbed by the Sunnis. This theory initially met with resistance especially in Baghdad, until Ibn Hanbal and the majority of his followers were won over to it. The opposition in Syria continued for some time, but eventually this position came to be the majority position in Islam, with only the Shi'ites and Kharijites holding contrary views. Henceforth the term Uthmani was used in a narrower sense to represent certain positions within Sunnism. Those moderate Shi'ites who had been won over to the four caliph theory, nevertheless considered Ali superior in merit to Uthman. Their ordering of meritorious rightly guided caliphs ran in the order: Abu Bakr, Umar, Ali, and Uthman. These labelled Uthmani those Sunnis who considered Uthman superior to Ali (i.e. Abu Bakr, Umar, Uthman, Ali). The majority of the Sunnis hold to this latter ordering and are in this sense Uthmani. Moreover, there were Zaydi Shi'a and Mu'tazila, who considered Ali superior to both Abu Bakr and Umar but nonetheless acknowledged their caliphate as legitimate. These labelled as Uthmani anyone who considered Ali less meritorious than the two. In this sense, all Sunnis are Uthmani.

After the disappearance of the traditionist Uthmaniyya, a pro-Umayyad Uthmani sect is attested in the 10th century. They venerated all Umayyad caliphs and defended their religio-political imamate and considered them rightly guided caliphs. The sources do not mention Uthmaniyya beyond the 10th century.

Notes

References

Sources

 
 
 
 
 

7th-century Islam
Religion in the Umayyad Caliphate
Religion in the Rashidun Caliphate
Religion in the Abbasid Caliphate
Uthman